|}

The September Stakes is a Group 3 flat horse race in Great Britain open to horses aged three years or older. It is run at Kempton Park over a distance of 1 mile 3 furlongs and 219 yards (2,413 metres), and it is scheduled to take place each year in early September.

History
The event was established in 1979, and it was originally contested on turf over 1 mile, 3 furlongs and 30 yards. For a period it was classed at Listed level, and it was promoted to Group 3 status in 1982.

The race was transferred to Epsom and extended by about 200 yards in 1997. It returned to Kempton in 2000.

The September Stakes was held at Newmarket in 2005, as its regular venue was closed for redevelopment. It was switched to Kempton's newly opened Polytrack track in 2006.

Records
<div style="font-size:90%">
Most successful horse (2 wins):
 Enable – 2018, 2020
 Mutamam – 2000, 2001
 Prince Bishop - 2013, 2014

Leading jockey (4 wins):
 Frankie Dettori – Mamool (2004), Kirklees (2009), Enable (2018, 2020)
 Richard Hills – Mutamam (2000), Mubtaker (2003), Imperial Stride (2005), Laaheb (2010)
 Walter Swinburn – Shernazar (1985), Dihistan (1986), Young Buster (1991), Sacrament (1996)Leading trainer (6 wins):
 Sir Michael Stoute – Shernazar (1985), Dihistan (1986), Sacrament (1996), Imperial Stride (2005), Modun (2011), Arab Spring (2016)</div>

Winners

 The 2005 running took place at Newmarket.

See also
 Horse racing in Great Britain
 List of British flat horse races

References
 Paris-Turf:
 Racing Post:
 galopp-sieger.de – September Stakes. horseracingintfed.com – International Federation of Horseracing Authorities – September Stakes (2018). pedigreequery.com – September Stakes – Kempton.''
 

Flat races in Great Britain
Kempton Park Racecourse
Open middle distance horse races
Recurring sporting events established in 1979
1979 establishments in England